Paul Levy (born 26 February 1941 in Lexington, Kentucky) is a US/British author and journalist.  He lives with his wife, Penelope Marcus, and children in Oxfordshire and London, UK.

With Ann Barr (and synchronically Gael Greene), he coined the word "foodie" (and some say exemplified the concept). He has won many British and American food writing and journalism prizes, including two commendations in the British Press Awards, in 1985 and 1987.

Education
Levy attended Lafayette High School, Lexington, KY; University of Chicago; University College London; Harvard (Ph.D. 1979); Nuffield College, Oxford.

Work experience
Levy was Food and Wine editor for The Observer in the 1980s. He was subsequently arts correspondent for The Wall Street Journal, where he reported to Raymond Sokolov,  and Wall Street Journal Europe. He blogs on culture at ArtsJournal.com/plainenglish, contributes food-related pieces to Travel + Leisure, and obituaries to the Independent. He is co-literary executor with Michael Holroyd of Lytton Strachey's estate, trustee of the Strachey Trust, Jane Grigson Trust, and co-chair with Claudia Roden of the Oxford Symposium on Food and Cookery.

Publications

(ed.) Lytton Strachey: The Really Interesting Question, 1972
Moore: G.E. Moore and the Cambridge Apostles, 1979
(co-ed. with Michael Holroyd) The Shorter Strachey, 1980
(co-author with Ann Barr) The Official Foodie Handbook, 1984
Out to Lunch, 1986
Finger-Lickin' Good: A Kentucky childhood, 1990
The Feast of Christmas, 1992. Writer and presenter of 5-part Channel Four network/ABC (Australia)/CBC (Canada) TV series with same title
(ed.) The Penguin Book of Food and Drink, 1996
(ed.) Eminent Victorians, The Definitive Edition, 2002
(ed.) The Letters of Lytton Strachey, 2005

References

External links
PaulLevy.com
 Paul Levy interview with Máirtín Mac Con Iomaire (Oxford Oral History Project)
Oxfordsymposium.org
JaneGrigsonTrust.org

1941 births
Living people

American food writers
American male journalists
British male journalists
Alumni of University College London
Alumni of Nuffield College, Oxford
Harvard University alumni
Writers from Lexington, Kentucky
Fellows of the Royal Society of Literature